Barry Sullivan may refer to:

Barry Sullivan (American actor) (1912–1994), US film and Broadway actor
Barry Sullivan (stage actor) (1821–1891), Irish born stage actor active in Britain and Australia
Barry Sullivan (lawyer), Chicago lawyer and the Cooney & Conway Chair in Advocacy at Loyola University Chicago School of Law
Barry Sullivan (ice hockey) (1927–1989), ice hockey player in the National Hockey League
Barry F. Sullivan, American investment banker and politician
Barry K. Sullivan, the current Majority Floor Services Chief of the United States House of Representatives

See also
Barry O'Sullivan (disambiguation)